Robert Earl Bennett (born May 23, 1943) is an American former competition swimmer, Olympic medalist, and former world record-holder.

Bennett attended the University of Southern California (USC), where he competed for the USC Trojans swimming and diving team from 1963 to 1965.  He received All-American honors for three consecutive years, and graduated in 1965.

Bennett represented the United States at the 1960 and 1964 Summer Olympics.  At the 1960 Rome games, he received a bronze medal for his third-place result in the men's 100-meter backstroke, finishing in 1:02.3 – a fraction of a second behind Australian David Theile (1:01.9) and fellow American Frank McKinney (1:02.1).  He also swam for the gold medal-winning U.S. team in the heats of the 4×100-meter medley relay, setting a new world record of 4:08.2 in the process.  He did not receive a medal, however, because he did not swim in the event final, and was not medal-eligible under the 1964 Olympic swimming rules.

Four years later at the 1964 Tokyo games, he won a second bronze medal in the men's 200-meter backstroke (2:13.1).  He again swam for the first-place U.S. team in the preliminary heats of the 4×100-meter medley relay, but was again ineligible to receive a medal.

Bennett set a new world record of 1.01.3 in the 100-meter backstroke on August 19, 1961; the record survived for twelve months until broken by American Tom Stock.

See also
 List of Olympic medalists in swimming (men)
 List of University of Southern California people
 World record progression 100 metres backstroke
 World record progression 4 × 100 metres medley relay

References

1943 births
Living people
American male backstroke swimmers
World record setters in swimming
Olympic bronze medalists for the United States in swimming
Swimmers from Los Angeles
Swimmers at the 1960 Summer Olympics
Swimmers at the 1964 Summer Olympics
USC Trojans men's swimmers
Medalists at the 1964 Summer Olympics
Medalists at the 1960 Summer Olympics
20th-century American people
21st-century American people